Ishtar Yasin Gutierrez was born in 1968 in Moscow, Russia to an Iraqi father and Chilean-Costa Rican mother She is a director and scriptwriter.  
Director of El Camino, a film designed for the Latin American cinema, was described as an "impressive debut", shot in Costa Rica, Nicaragua and France.

Biography
Yasin was born in Moscow in 1968, and now lives in Costa Rica. Her father is the acclaimed Iraqi theater director Mohsen Sadoon Yasin and her mother was a Chilean ballet dancer and choreographer Elena Gutierrez, the daughter of recognized writer Joaquin Gutierrez.

Yasin's family settled back in Chile, not long before leaving in 1973, as they were threatened by players and supporters of the military coup of General Augusto Pinochet. In 1985, at the age of seventeen, Yasin followed in her father's footsteps and went to Moscow, Russia to the Institute of Art to complete her academic and artistic training, as part of her classes. Here she earned a master's degree in Theater and Film Interpretation.

Her dramatic piece entitled Night Cadabra, had been released with great public and critical success in Buenos Aires, Chile and Costa Rica. In addition, her stories have enjoyed tremendous outreach in the Costa Rican literary circles.

Filmography
 The Path (El Camino) (2007)

References

External links
 
 Biografia de Ishtar Yasin Gutiérrez (Biography)

1968 births
Living people
Chilean people of Iraqi descent
Chilean film directors
Chilean women film directors
Russian film directors
Chilean people of Costa Rican descent
20th-century Chilean women writers
21st-century Chilean women writers

Costa Rican film directors